A criticality accident occurred on December 30, 1958, at the Los Alamos National Laboratory in Los Alamos, New Mexico, in the United States. It is one of 60 known criticality events that have occurred outside the controlled conditions of a nuclear reactor or test, though it was the third such event that took place in 1958 after events on June 16 at the Y-12 Plant in Oak Ridge, Tennessee, and on October 15 at the Vinča Nuclear Institute in Vinča, Yugoslavia. The accident involved plutonium compounds dissolved in liquid chemical reagents; within 35 hours, it killed chemical operator Cecil Kelley by severe radiation poisoning.

Context of the accident

Cecil Kelley was a 38-year-old chemical operator with 11 years of experience; he had spent more than half of this time at the Los Alamos lab, where one of his duties was to operate a large, 1000-liter capacity, stainless-steel mixing tank. The tank contained residual plutonium-239—a mostly man-made element existing in trace amounts in nature—from other experiments and applications, along with various organic solvents and acids in an aqueous solution for the purpose of recovery and reuse. In pure form and under normal temperature and pressure conditions, plutonium is a solid, silvery metal. It tarnishes quickly when exposed to air and readily dissolves in concentrated hydrochloric, hydroiodic, and perchloric acids, as well as others. On the day of the accident, the mixing tank was supposed to contain a "lean" concentration of dissolved plutonium (≤0.1 g of plutonium per liter of solution) in a bath of highly corrosive nitric acid and a caustic, stabilized, aqueous, organic emulsion. The concentration of plutonium in the mixing tank was nearly 200 times higher than Kelley anticipated, however, as a result of at least two improper transfers of plutonium waste to the tank from undetermined sources. Additionally, the plutonium was distributed unevenly, with the upper layer of solution containing especially high concentrations, amounting to a total of over 3 kg of plutonium, dangerously close to criticality. When Kelley switched on the mixer, a vortex began to form. The denser aqueous layer within the tank was forced outward and upward forming a "bowl", and the less dense, plutonium-rich layer was drawn toward the vessel's center.

Supercritical mass
Among other ideal characteristics, the optimal shape for any fissile substance to become supercritical is the shape of least surface area, a sphere. Although the plutonium-rich solution was not spherical, the vortex made it thicker in the center, and this, along with the corresponding increase in density and the neutron reflectivity of the aqueous layer surrounding it, caused the dissolved plutonium to reach and cross the criticality threshold in approximately one second: neutrons within the mixture began to bombard the nuclei of the solution's plutonium atoms with sufficient frequency to cause these atoms to break apart and release other neutrons in a sustained nuclear chain reaction lasting only 200 microseconds but releasing a huge burst of neutrons and gamma radiation. Such an uncontrolled release of nuclear energy is often referred to as an excursion. Within 3 seconds, the layers in the mixture had become dispersed, and no further excursions were possible.

Events of the excursion
Kelley had been standing on a ladder looking at the contents of the mixing tank through a viewing window when the excursion event occurred. Two other technicians working within the laboratory witnessed a bright flash of blue light followed by the sound of a thud. The power burst either caused Kelley to collapse or knocked him off the ladder, and he had fallen to the ground. He arose disoriented, and apparently switched the mixer off and then back on again before running out of the building. The other technicians found him there in the snow in a state of ataxia (uncoordinated muscle movement) and repeating the phrase, "I'm burning up! I'm burning up!"

Because the possibility of an excursion taking place in a mixing tank had been considered to be virtually non-existent, the technicians decided that Kelley must have somehow been exposed to either alpha radiation, the acid bath, or both, and one of them took him to a chemical shower while the other switched off the mixer. Additional staff members arrived at the scene within minutes to find Kelley virtually unconscious. The bright pink color of his face indicated erythema (redness of the skin) brought on by cutaneous radiation syndrome.

Any accident at Los Alamos involving a radioactive substance requires an immediate investigation by a team of radiation monitoring staff. Even before Kelley was taken to an emergency room, these staff members began an examination of the mixing room with radiation detectors capable of assessing the alpha radiation emitted by escaped plutonium. Alpha activity would have been widespread if any of the plutonium mixture had escaped from the tank, but none was found. Eighteen minutes later, the team began searching for gamma radiation, and were surprised to find intense gamma radiation near the mixing tank, on the order of tens of rads per hour. Such intense gamma radiation could only be produced by significant amounts of fission product; this, combined with the otherwise inexplicable flash of light reported by the other two technicians, was sufficient to confirm that a criticality accident had occurred.

Kelley's clinical course
For the first hour and forty minutes following the accident, Kelley had been incoherent, and had gone through waves of intense vomiting and retching. He then stabilized, was once again able to converse normally, and was able to have his pulse taken and his blood drawn. The blood sample indicated that Kelley had been exposed to approximately 9 Gy from fast neutrons and 27 Gy from gamma rays, for a total of 36 Gy. For an adult human, exposure to 2 Gy from an unfocused radiation source such as an excursion will cause radiation sickness but is not considered definitely lethal; about 4 Gy is the median lethal dose; a dose of 8 Gy almost always kills. Kelley had received more than seven times the adult human lethal dose. Although the medical staff in the emergency room took steps to ease his pain with pethidine and morphine, previous research on radiation exposure in animals indicated Kelley's death was inevitable. Within six hours his lymphocytes were all but gone. A bone biopsy performed 24 hours after the incident produced bone marrow that was watery and contained no red blood cells. Numerous blood transfusions had no lasting helpful effect: Only 35 hours after his initial exposure and after a final bout of intense restlessness, agitation, sweating, becoming ashen-skinned, and having an irregular pulse, Kelley would die of heart failure.

Implications
An investigation into the circumstances of the accident never resulted in a public explanation of how the mixing tank became filled with such a high concentration of plutonium; initially, the blame was placed on Kelley himself.

Robert L. Nance, a colleague of Kelley, was the chemist assigned to recover the remaining plutonium in the tank. This task revealed to him that the solvent in the tank was not as potent as expected (possibly broken down by extended exposure to radiation), so there may have been a build up to a higher concentration for that reason. The report prepared by Nance was not approved to be published.

Although Kelley had neither ingested nor inhaled any plutonium during the accident, he, like many laboratory technicians at Los Alamos, had been exposed to minute particles of airborne plutonium over the course of several years. An event such as this was therefore considered an "experiment of opportunity." Careful records were kept of every moment of Kelley's life from accident through death and onto the autopsy table. His organs were kept for pathological examination and their plutonium levels analyzed. The results of these tissue analyses were considered fundamental to understanding what would happen to a population during a nuclear attack and impossible to obtain any other way. Although the bone marrow biopsy of Kelley's sternum was performed under the premise that the physicians wished to determine if he were a candidate for a bone marrow transplant, Kelley's death was inevitable, and an actual transplant was not seriously considered.

Court case
Kelley's death left a widow, Doris Kelley, and two children, then aged eight years and 18 months. Doris Kelley did not receive notification while he was still alive that her husband had been irradiated, and only learned of his death from the laboratory authority when representatives visited her at her home shortly afterward. Assuring her verbally that they would provide her with financial compensation for her husband's death, they convinced her not to file any lawsuits against the laboratory. Despite such assurances, the only compensation Doris Kelley received was a lifetime-level position working for the lab itself at near-poverty levels, until she had to retire for health reasons.

In 1996, Doris Kelley and her daughter, Katie Kelley-Mareau, filed a lawsuit against Clarence Lushbaugh, the pathologist who performed the autopsy on Cecil Kelley. The case alleged the misconduct of doctors, the hospital, and the administration of Los Alamos in removing organs from the deceased without consent from next-of-kin over a span of many years (1958–1980). Kelley's autopsy was the first instance of this type of post-mortem analysis, but there were many more performed by Lushbaugh and others in later years at Los Alamos.  During a deposition for the case, Lushbaugh, when asked who gave him the authority to take  of organs and tissue from Kelley's body, said, "God gave me permission." The class action suit was settled by the defendants for about $9.5 million in 2002 and an additional $800,000 in 2007. None of the defendants admitted any wrongdoing.

References

1958 in New Mexico
Medical controversies in the United States
Victims of radiological poisoning
Los Alamos National Laboratory
Deaths from laboratory accidents
1958 disasters in the United States
Nuclear accidents and incidents in the United States